William Penn School District et al. v. Pennsylvania Department of Education et al. was a landmark decision of the Commonwealth Court of Pennsylvania on funding for public education by the Pennsylvania General Assembly. The Court ruled that the underfunding of rural and underprivileged school districts violated the Pennsylvania Constitution.

Background 

Pennsylvania primarily funds schools at the local level through local property taxes.

History 

In 2014, the William Penn School District partnered with the Public Interest Law Center along with several other school districts, parents, and advocacy groups to file a lawsuit saying that the state's process for funding schools, which relies heavily on local taxes, thereby creating significant per-student funding gaps between wealthy districts and low-wealth ones, is tantamount to discrimination.

Ruling 
On , the Court ruled that the Pennsylvania General Assembly had created “manifest deficiencies” between high-wealth and low-wealth school districts with “no rational basis” for the funding gaps. The ruling stated that the Pennsylvania Constitution's Education Clause was “clearly, palpably, and plainly violated because of a failure to provide all students with access to a comprehensive, effective, and contemporary system of public education that will give them a meaningful opportunity to succeed academically, socially, and civically.”

References 

Pennsylvania General Assembly
Politics of Pennsylvania
Commonwealth Court of Pennsylvania
2023 in Pennsylvania
Public education in Pennsylvania
Public schools in Pennsylvania
Taxation in Pennsylvania
Pennsylvania state case law
2023 in United States case law